The 2003 Liège–Bastogne–Liège was the 89th edition of the Liège–Bastogne–Liège cycle race and was held on 27 April 2003. The race started in Liège and finished in Ans. The race was won by Tyler Hamilton of the CSC team.

General classification

References

2003
2003 in Belgian sport
Liege-Bastogne-Liege
2003 in road cycling
April 2003 sports events in Europe